Bertil Josef Zachrisson (born 2 May 1926) is a Swedish politician.

Zachrisson was editor of Svensk Veckotidning before serving as a Social Democrat MP from 1969 until 1983. He was Minister for Education from 1973 to 1976 and director general (postmaster general) of Postverket, the Swedish post office, from 1982 to 1988. Zachrisson was also active in the Religious Social Democrats of Sweden organisation.

References 

Living people
1926 births
Postmasters-General
People from Gothenburg
Swedish politicians
Swedish Ministers for Education